Frederick Douglass High School is a public school located in northwest Atlanta, Georgia, United States, bordering the Collier Heights and Center Hill communities.

History 
Since 1968, Frederick Douglass High School has served the communities of historic Collier Heights, Peyton Forest, Cascade Heights, Center Hill, and the city of Atlanta. Atlanta Public Schools established Douglass High School to relieve overcrowding at nearby Harper, Turner, and West Fulton High Schools. All three of these (as well as the defunct Archer High School) eventually merged with Douglass.

About 800 students attended Douglass High School as of 2016, making it one of the smaller high schools in the Atlanta Public School System.

From 2002 to 2004 the school was renovated to update the main building and add a gymnasium and auditorium. These buildings honor former principals Lester W. Butts and Samuel L. Hill. In 2009, Frederick Douglass High School was listed in the National Historic Registry as one of the buildings in "The Collier Heights Historic District: Atlanta's Premier African American Suburb".

Academics 
Douglass High School is made up of several small learning communities:
CFEAT - Center for Engineering and Applied Technology
C&J - Communications and Journalism
HTM - Center for Hospitality, Tourism, and Marketing
B&E - Center for Business and Entrepreneurship

Feeder patterns 
Elementary schools feeding Douglass are Grove Park, F.L. Stanton, Usher, and White. Middle schools feeding Douglass are Harper-Archer and Kennedy.

Student activities

Athletics 

Douglass High School competes in the Georgia High School Association Region 6, the state's second-highest classification of 4A.  The school's team are known as the Astros, and its colours are black and gold.

The sports available for the competition are softball, varsity and junior varsity football, cross country, varsity and junior varsity girls' and boys' basketball, track and field, boys' and girls' soccer, golf, and air rifle. All home varsity football games are played at Lakewood Stadium.

The boys' basketball program has won the state championship once (in 1984). However, the team has reached the final four 16 times (1970, 1972, 1973, 1974, 1975, 1976, 1977, 1978, 1980, 1984, 1987, 1988, 1990, 1991, 1993, 1999), and has captured 27 regional championships (1970–1985, 1987–1991, 1993, 1994, 1999, 2008). They have played in the finals seven times (1972, 1973, 1974, 1975, 1976, 1984, 1991).

Douglass' dominance was achieved under two coaches, Donald Dollar (1971–1991) and Jesse Bonner (1992–2000). The girls' basketball team reached their first state final four in March 2007.

The football team has reached the state finals once (1975), and has sent numerous athletes to college on scholarships. They have won five regional championships, in 1975, 1978, 1995, 1998 and 2004.

Douglass has three tennis courts to accommodate their varsity tennis team. Students are encouraged to join whether they are beginners or avid players.

The girls' track and field team won the state championship title in 1993 and the boys' track team won the state crown in 1994. The boys' track team also won the 4x400 state title and finished second in state in 2008.

Other championships
Since 1993, the school has been a participant in the Stock Market Game, sponsored by the Georgia Council on Economic Education. In spring 2000, it became the first and only predominantly black high school in the Atlanta Public School System to win the state championship. Team Coach and Sponsor Jill Dockett Beracki is a graduate of the high school. On May 7, 2010, Douglass' team, led by captain Brandon Dykes, won the National Championship sponsored by the SIFMA Foundation for Investor Education. The five-member team, Beracki, and Dr. Martin of the Georgia Council on Economic Education were flown to Washington, D.C. to attend an awards ceremony at the Capitol. They were honored by Congressman John Lewis.  Beracki had taught at Douglass for 26 years.

Marching Astros 
Douglass' Marching Astros Band has competed in the annual Original Battle of the Bands Showcase and in jamborees locally and out of state. They have been highly televised and voted the #1 band in the Atlanta Public School District in the 2017-18 season. They also appear in parades and perform at events including by invitation. V.H. Moody, the former band director, was the longest working band director in Atlanta Public Schools. The current band director is Micah Wynn.

The band has made trips to Philadelphia, Nashville, Florida, Bermuda, Magic City Classic, the Florida Classic in Orlando, and to the nation's second largest St. Patrick's Day parade, in Savannah. They were invited to perform at the New England Patriots' halftime show and selected members performed at the Super Bowl XXXIII halftime show. The percussion section, known as DDD (Douglass Deadly Drummers), have been featured on television, opening show for nationally televised games, and performing for known celebrities and government officials. In 2005, DDD won the First City and Statewide Drumline Competition, first place in APS and third place in State, bringing home the first cash prize and trophy for a single performance. The Douglass Deadly Drummers won a drumline competition against Osborne High School on September 17, 2011.

They also marched in two Mardi Gras parades (Thoth & Rex) thanks to tuba section leader Stephon Wheeler who reached out to artist and alumni Killer Mike, Lil Jon and T.I who all contributed funds and helped fundraise for the trip.

“Where there is no struggle, there is no progress”

Band director Micah Wynn along with Stephon and drum major Joshua Koonce were interviewed by The Atlanta Journal-Constitution and WGCL-TV (cbs 46) making the public aware of their efforts to get the band to New Orleans.

Notable alumni

References

Atlanta Public Schools high schools